Begishevo Airport  is an airport in Russia located 19 km east of Nizhnekamsk, Tatarstan. It has a very large apron and a number of hangars and buildings.

History
The construction of Begishevo airport started in 1970 on initiative of Nizhnekamskneftekhim. A first, technical flight was effected on 25 December 1971 on an An-24 airplane. Regular flights within Tatarstan (Kazan, Chistopol, Muslyumovo, Aktanysh, Yelabuga) started in 1972. During the next few years, Begishevo Airport established connections with the main cities of European Russia, Ukraine and Georgia. The airport obtained international status in 1998. In 2008, it became independent from Tatarstan Airlines as OAO Begishevo Airport. 99.95% of its shares belong to OAO KAMAZ (as of 30 June 2011).

Airlines and destinations

External links

References

  

Airports built in the Soviet Union
Airports in Tatarstan